The Second Government of the Prime Minister Ilir Meta was the 60th Government of the Republic of Albania which was officially mandated by President Rexhep Meidani on 7 September 2001. After the 2001 election, the alliance led by the Socialist Party won the majority for the second time in a row and managed to create a post–electoral coalition of 86 seats in Parliament to form the new government.

History 
After the elections of 24 June 2001, the coalition of the Socialist Party managed to create a consensus to reconfirm Mr.Ilir Meta as the next Prime Minister. On 7 September 2001, the government proposed by the coalition was officially decreed by the President. The oath was taken on the same day in the Presidential Palace. After the constitution of the new parliament, as it was foreseen the presentation of the governing program should be done in the first weeks of September following the oath of the new deputies, the election of the Speaker of Parliament but also the constitution of its bodies, however in the 11 September session, the Speaker of the newly elected of parliament announced with a trembling voice that a terrorist attack had taken place in the United States where several planes had hit various buildings in that state.

"I want to express the strongest condemnation against these bandit acts. At the same time I want to express the strong solidarity of the Albanian Parliament with the United States of America. This is a solidarity that stems from the friendship of the Albanian people with the American people, "It is a solidarity that stems from the admiration of the Albanian people for the American government. Expressing this solidarity, I think we should interrupt the session, so that the members of the assembly can follow the developments of this serious event," said the then Speaker of the Assembly. , Namik Dokle.

A few minutes after the dissolution of the parliament, Prime Minister Ilir Meta, after consultation with the chairman of the Socialist Party, Fatos Nano, announced the reason for the postponement of the parliamentary session, while expressing his condolences for the tragedy that was happening. Meanwhile, lawmakers gathered near Mother Teresa Square to light candles for the victims of the World Trade Center towers in New York.

Internal clashes and resignation 
The government itself was characterized by instability and strong criticism within it from the first days of its formation. This conflict came as a result of the duality between the chairman of the socialist party Fatos Nano and the incumbent prime minister Ilir Meta, escalating in the General Steering Committee of the Socialist Party held between 3 December and 5 December 2001, from where the chairman of the party attacked some ministers as corrupt, incompetent, and that they do not reflect the will of the voters of this party. During this meeting 4 ministers offered their resignation, they were: Anastas Angjeli, Mustafa Muçi, Bashkim Fino, and a few days later also Agron Duka.

On 10 December 2001, Prime Minister Meta proposed to the leadership of the Socialist Party the replacement ministers, names that did not find a consensus of the leadership of the party. However, Meta ignored the decision and on 14 December addressed President Meidani for their decree, which the latter did on the same day.

However, the internal clashes continued even at the beginning of the new year and this forced Ilir Mete to resign from the leadership of the government on 29 January 2002.

Cabinet 
After the 2001 elections, the Socialist Party (PS) decided to run without coalition and managed to secure 73 seats. Although capable of forming a government with such number of deputies, the aim was to create an even more stable government with the objective of electing the next president of the country for which 60% of the votes of the Parliament was needed. Thus in a post-election agreement, PS managed to form a government in addition to the Social Democratic Party which was a traditional ally, also with the Unity for Human Rights Party, the Agrarian Party, and the Democratic Alliance Party. The latter was a center-right party whose members were founders and former allies of the Democratic Party.

See also 
 Politics of Albania
 Council of Ministers of Albania

References

G60
2001 establishments in Albania
Ministries established in 2001
Cabinets established in 2001